was a Japanese composer of contemporary classical music.

Biography
Uchida was born in Tokyo, Japan. He studied at the Tokyo University of the Arts under Tomojirō Ikenouchi, Akio Yashiro and Akira Miyoshi and continued his studies from 1965 at the Conservatoire de Paris under André Jolivet, Henri Dutilleux and Simone Plé-Caussade. In 1968 Masato Uchida returned to the Tokyo University of the Arts and graduated in 1971. During his last study years he founded the composer group "whitecap" (jap. 白波) together with Shigeaki Saegusa, Shin-ichiro Ikebe and Norio Fukushi.

After his graduation Uchida worked as a composer and teacher. He became a professor at the Tokyo Junshin Women's College, later also at the Tokyo University of the Arts and the Kyoto City University of Arts. From the 1970s he was also a member of the Victor Music Classroom Project, a Japanese organization which was part of the Victor Company of Japan and specialized in teaching children to play piano on the JVC keyboards. Uchida composed several compositions for piano student for this project. In 1990 he became the director of the Victor Technics Music School and worked as a consultant until his death. He died in Tokyo.

Compositions
 Thravsma I, for 2 flutes
 Thravsma II
 Thravsma III, for piano, violin and cello (1967), published by JFC
 Thravsma IV
 Thravsma V, for clarinet, 2 violins, viola and cello (1970), published by JFC
 Meteora series, for example Meteora II, for marimba
 Requiem
 Several compositions for piano students

References

External links
Biography of the composer on the website dedicated to his compositions for piano students

1940 births
1997 deaths
20th-century classical composers
Japanese classical composers
Japanese male classical composers
20th-century Japanese composers
20th-century Japanese male musicians